The Siebel Classic in Silicon Valley was a golf tournament on the Champions Tour from 2001 to 2002. It was last played in San Jose, California at the Coyote Creek Golf Club.

The purse for the 2002 tournament was US$1,400,000, with $210,000 going to the winner.

Winners
2002 Dana Quigley
2001 Hale Irwin

Source:

References

Former PGA Tour Champions events
Golf in California
Sports in San Jose, California
Annual events in Silicon Valley